Banff was a burgh constituency that elected one commissioner to the Parliament of Scotland and to the Convention of Estates.

After the Acts of Union 1707, Banff, Cullen, Elgin, Inverurie and Kintore formed the Elgin district of burghs, returning one member between them to the House of Commons of Great Britain.

List of burgh commissioners
 1543: Walter Ogilvy
 1587: Thomas Ogilvy
 1621: Alexander Craig
 1628–33: Andrew Baird
 1630 convention: not represented
 1639–41: Andrew Baird (until 1641); then Alexander Douglas (in 1641)
 1643–44 convention: Alexander Douglas
 1644–47: Alexander Douglas (until 1645); Gilbert Moir (from 1646)
 1648: Gilbert Moir 
 1649–41: Alexander Douglas
 1661–63: Patrick Stewart, town clerk 
 1665 convention: Robert Hamilton
 1667 convention: Walter Sheroun
 1669–74: William Cumming (until 1672)
 1678 convention: Thomas Ogilvy
 1681–82: William Fyfe
 1685–86: Walter Steuart
 1689 convention: Walter Steuart, provost
 1689–1701: Walter Steuart (until his death in 1701); 
 1702, 1703–07: Sir Alexander Ogilvy

See also
 List of constituencies in the Parliament of Scotland at the time of the Union

References
 Joseph Foster, Members of Parliament, Scotland, 1882.

Burghs represented in the Parliament of Scotland (to 1707)
Constituencies disestablished in 1707
History of Moray
Politics of the county of Banff
Banff, Aberdeenshire
1707 disestablishments in Scotland